Kerim is both a masculine given name and a surname. People with the name include:

Given name
Kerim Chatty (born 1973), Swedish man suspected of attempted hijacking of an aircraft in 2002
Kerim Erim (1894–1952), Turkish mathematician and physicist
Kerim Frei (born 1993), Turkish-Swiss footballer
Kerim Kerimov (1917–2003), Azerbaijani rocket scientist
Kerim Seiler (born 1974), Swiss artist and architect
Kerim Zengin, Turkish footballer
Kerim Mrabti, Swedish footballer

Surname
Mahmoud Kerim (1916–1999), squash player from Egypt
Reşat Kerim (born 1986), Azerbaijani footballer
Srgjan Kerim, former President of the United Nations General Assembly
Tijani Ould Kerim (born 1951), Mauritania teacher and diplomat
Usin Kerim, Romani poet
Yaya Kerim (born 1991), Chadian football striker

See also

Karim (disambiguation)
Kerimäki
Kerimler (disambiguation)
Kerimov
Krim (disambiguation)

Surnames
Masculine given names
Bosniak masculine given names
Turkish masculine given names